Tsaobis Leopard Park is a protected reserve of Namibia, located south of Omaruru and east of Swakopmund. The private reserve was established in 1969.

It covers an area of 2349 square kilometers.

After gaining Namibian independence, the park was opened as a farm tourist destination. In the period from 1958 to 1972, pegmatite was excavated here, from the processing of which the known minerals, aquamarine, tourmaline and heliodor, were derived.

References

Nature reserves in Namibia
Protected areas established in 1969
Erongo Region